Taranis mayi is a species of sea snail, a marine gastropod mollusk in the family Raphitomidae.

Description
The length of the shell attains 4.6 mm, its diameter 2.4 mm.

(Original description) The  thin, oval, white shell consists of four whorls besides a brown protoconch of 2 whorls, which are convex, apparently smooth, but under the microscope very finely spirally lirate and interstitially punctate. The spire-whorls are convex medially sharply angulate with a cord, base contracted, and forming a moderately long siphonal canal, which is slightly curved to the left. The sutures are distinct and  finely canaliculate. The aperture is obliquely oval. The outer lip is thin, simple, ridged outside by the spirals, with an obtuse shallow, wide triangular sinus at the angulation.

Sculpture : above the angle are three spirals in each whorl, and one below it. In the body whorl are eighteen, subdistant just below the angle, crowded towards the siphonal canal. Very fine axials, about 42 in the penultimate whorl, run obliquely back from the suture to the angle, and then at an obtuse angle obliquely forward to the suture.

Variations: One example has only one spiral above its very sharp angle, namely, a bold cord just below the suture, 
making this more channelled  and only one below the angle just above the suture in the second and third whorls, and
seven in the body whorl.

Distribution
This marine species is endemic to Australia and occurs off South Australia.

References

 Powell, A.W.B. 1966. The molluscan families Speightiidae and Turridae, an evaluation of the valid taxa, both Recent and fossil, with list of characteristic species. Bulletin of the Auckland Institute and Museum. Auckland, New Zealand 5: 1–184, pls 1–23 
 Gatliff, J.H. & Gabriel, C.J. 1912. Additions to and alterations in the Catalogue of Victorian Marine Mollusca. Proceedings of the Royal Society of Victoria n.s. 25(1): 169-175 
 Powell, A.W.B. 1967. The family Turridae in the Indo-Pacific. Part 1a. The Turrinae concluded. Indo-Pacific Mollusca 1(7): 409–443, pls 298-317
 Wilson, B. 1994. Australian marine shells. Prosobranch gastropods. Kallaroo, WA : Odyssey Publishing Vol. 2 370 pp.

External links
  Hedley, C. 1922. A revision of the Australian Turridae. Records of the Australian Museum 13(6): 213-359, pls 42-56 
 

mayi
Gastropods described in 1909
Gastropods of Australia